Žemaitis is the masculine form of a Lithuanian family name. The name means "Samogitian" in Lithuanian. Its feminine forms are: Žemaitienė (married woman or widow) and Žemaitytė (unmarried woman).

The surname may refer to:

Jonas Žemaitis, namesake of the General Jonas Žemaitis Military Academy of Lithuania
Feliksas Baltušis-Žemaitis, Lithuanian army brigade general and Red Army major general
Alan Zemaitis, American football cornerback
Tony Zemaitis, guitar maker from England
Viktorija Žemaitytė, Lithuanian female Olympic athlete
Zita Žemaitytė, art critic, recipient of the Lithuanian National Prize

Lithuanian-language surnames
Ethnonymic surnames